Oliver Tomlinson (born 19 May 2002) is an English professional footballer who plays as a defender for Chippenham Town on loan from Torquay United.

Career
Born in Ivybridge, Tomlinson joined Plymouth Argyle's academy as an under-13, and signed his first professional contract in 2020.

He made his professional debut on 8 September 2020, when he started in Argyle's 3–2 defeat to Norwich City U21s in the EFL Trophy. Just a few days after making his debut, Tomlinson signed on loan for Southern League Div1 South side Barnstaple Town. He made his league debut for Plymouth on 1 May 2021 as a 68th-minute substitute in a 3–1 defeat to Sunderland.

On 4 November 2021, Tomlinson joined Southern League Premier Division South side Truro City on a three-month loan deal.

Tomlinson was released by Plymouth at the end of the 2021–22 season before signing for National League club Torquay United in July 2022. In January 2023, he joined National League South side Taunton Town on loan. In March 2023, he joined Chippenham Town on a loan deal until the end of the season.

Career statistics

References

2002 births
Living people
English footballers
Association football defenders
Plymouth Argyle F.C. players
Barnstaple Town F.C. players
Truro City F.C. players
Torquay United F.C. players
Taunton Town F.C. players
Chippenham Town F.C. players
English Football League players
Southern Football League players
National League (English football) players